Amy Joan St. Eve (born November 20, 1965) is a United States circuit judge of the United States Court of Appeals for the Seventh Circuit. She previously served as a United States district judge of the United States District Court for the Northern District of Illinois.

Early life and education 

Raised in Belleville, Illinois, St. Eve received her Bachelor of Arts degree from Cornell University in 1987. Three years later, in 1990, she earned her Juris Doctor from Cornell Law School.

Legal career 

Following law school graduation, St. Eve was in private practice at Davis Polk & Wardwell in New York City from 1990 to 1994. She was an associate independent counsel at the Whitewater Independent Counsel's Office in Little Rock, Arkansas from 1994 to 1996, where she successfully prosecuted former Arkansas Governor Jim Guy Tucker and Whitewater partners Jim and Susan McDougal for fraud.

From 1996 until 2001, St. Eve served as an Assistant United States Attorney for the Northern District of Illinois. She was a Senior Counsel for Abbott Laboratories, Abbott Park, Illinois, from 2001 until 2002, when she became a federal judge.

Federal judicial career

District court service 

On March 21, 2002, St. Eve was nominated by President George W. Bush to a seat on the United States District Court for the Northern District of Illinois vacated by George W. Lindberg, who assumed senior status.  She was recommended for the post by United States Senator Peter Fitzgerald.  Fitzgerald told the Chicago Tribune in 2003 that before St. Eve applied for the judgeship, "I didn't know Amy or know anyone who knew Amy. I was looking for the best qualified person." She was confirmed by the United States Senate on August 1, 2002, and received her commission the following day.

St. Eve was reportedly considered by the Trump administration for the position of Director of the Federal Bureau of Investigation after the dismissal of James Comey, but ultimately did not receive the job as it went to Christopher A. Wray.

Her service on the district court terminated on May 23, 2018, upon elevation to the United States Court of Appeals for the Seventh Circuit.

Court of appeals service 

On February 12, 2018, President Donald Trump announced his intent to nominate St. Eve to an undetermined seat on the United States Court of Appeals for the Seventh Circuit. On February 15, 2018, her nomination was sent to the Senate. President Trump nominated St. Eve to the seat on the United States Court of Appeals for the Seventh Circuit vacated by Judge Ann Claire Williams, who assumed senior status on June 5, 2017. On March 21, 2018, a hearing on her nomination was held before the Senate Judiciary Committee. On April 19, 2018, her nomination was reported out of committee by a 21–0 vote. On May 14, 2018, her nomination was confirmed by a 91–0 vote. She received her judicial commission on May 23, 2018.

References

External links 
 
 

|-

1965 births
Living people
20th-century American lawyers
21st-century American lawyers
21st-century American judges
Assistant United States Attorneys
Cornell Law School alumni
Cornell University alumni
Davis Polk & Wardwell lawyers
Illinois lawyers
Judges of the United States District Court for the Northern District of Illinois
Judges of the United States Court of Appeals for the Seventh Circuit
Northwestern University Pritzker School of Law faculty
People from Belleville, Illinois
People from Glencoe, Illinois
United States Department of Justice lawyers
United States district court judges appointed by George W. Bush
United States court of appeals judges appointed by Donald Trump
American women legal scholars
20th-century American women lawyers
21st-century American women lawyers
21st-century American women judges